Fernando López Tuero  (1857–1907) was an agricultural scientist and agronomist who discovered the bug (believed at first to be a germ) which was destroying Puerto Rico sugar canes.

Agricultural epidemic
In the latter part of the 19th Century, an epidemic was affecting the agricultural industry of Puerto Rico. Among the crops affected was the sugar cane, whose main product "sugar" was vital to Puerto Rico's economy. The Spanish colonial government created an emergency commission composed of scientists, which included Dr. Agustín Stahl and Fernando López Tuero, to study the situation. Dr. Stahl concluded that the epidemic was caused by a "germ" in the terrain, however his findings were inconclusive. In 1894 Fernando López Tuero, the director and head agronomist of the Agronomical Station of Río Piedras, discovered that the cause of the epidemic was the white grub (Phyllophaga).

The Phyllophaga is a very large genus (more than 260 species) of New World scarab beetles in the subfamily Melolonthinae. These beetles are nocturnal, emerging in great numbers during the night. The adults are chafers, feeding on foliage of trees and shrubs. They may cause significant damage when emerging in large numbers. The larvae (called white grubs) feed on the roots of grasses and other plants.

López Tuero's scientific investigations have been included in Madre Teresa Cortés Zavala's "Fernando López Tuero, La Revista de Agricultura, Industria y Comercio de Puerto Rico y el progreso agrícola de 1885-1898" written for the Escuela de Historia; Universidad Michoacana de San Nicolás de Hidalgo.

Written works
López Tuero voiced strong beliefs about the function of a state, saying it was mainly to protect people's private property. His views were drafted into the 1878 Municipal Law which organized many of the police functions around just that, protect the large farms of landowners in the countryside. Some of his works include:
Imagen del editor  Unitarismo De La Patria Espanola: La Descentralizacion, El Regionalismo, Portugal, Gibraltar, Sintesis Del Unitarismo
Valoración de materias agrícolas
El chacolí santanderino en los siglos XIII al XIX
El hombre
Enfermedad de la caña de azúcar y modo de combartirla
Estado moral de los factores de la producción en Cuba y Puerto Rico
Café y piña de America
''Puerto Rico: Tipografía del "Boletin Mercantil", 1895

See also

List of Puerto Ricans
Puerto Rican scientists and inventors

Notes

References

Further reading
 

1857 births
1907 deaths
Puerto Rican scientists
Spanish agronomists